Cylostrobus is genus of Lycopsida most like Pleuromeia, but with very compact and round cones. It is known from the Early Triassic of Australia, coincident with a marked greenhouse spike at the end of the Early Triassic. The genus Cylostrobus was erected for the compact cone only, in the paleobotanical system of form genera, but these small plants are well enough understood that the name Cylostrobus sydneyensis is used for the whole plant, rather than the old name Pleuromeia longicaulis. Other species of Pleuromeia have attached cones that are less compact and produce different spores.

See also 

 Evolution of plants

References 

Prehistoric lycophytes
Triassic plants
Prehistoric lycophyte genera